Strongylopus ('strongylos'=round, 'pus'=foot) is a genus of pyxicephalid frogs native to Africa. They are found in the area from southwestern South Africa and Namibia to northern Tanzania.  Their common name is stream frogs.

Description
Species within this genus may be found at altitudes from sea level up to 3250 m in elevation. They generally occur in riparian habitats, including fynbos heath, grassland, montane flooded grassland, savanna and forest edge. Some species occur in more specific habitats, such as Strongylopus kilimanjaro in alpine moorland near cold water streams.

Species
These species belong to this genus:
 Strongylopus bonaespei (Dubois, 1981) – Banded stream frog
 Strongylopus fasciatus (Smith, 1849) – Striped stream frog
 Strongylopus fuelleborni (Nieden, 1911) – Fuelleborn's stream frog
 Strongylopus grayii (Smith, 1849) – Gray's stream frog
 Strongylopus kilimanjaro (Clarke and Poynton, 2005)
 Strongylopus kitumbeine (Channing and Davenport, 2002)
 Strongylopus merumontanus (Lönnberg, 1910)
 Strongylopus rhodesianus (Hewitt, 1933) – Chimanimani stream frog
 Strongylopus springbokensis (Channing, 1986) – Namaqua stream frog
 Strongylopus wageri (Wager, 1961) – Wager's stream frog

References

 
Pyxicephalidae
Amphibians of Sub-Saharan Africa
Amphibian genera
Taxa named by Johann Jakob von Tschudi